Isidora Sekulić (16 February 1877 – 5 April 1958) was a Serbian writer, novelist, essayist, polyglot and art critic. She was "the first woman academic in the history of Serbia".

Biography
Sekulić was born in Mošorin, a village of Bács-Bodrog County, (now Serbia). Apart from her studies in literature, Sekulić was also well versed in natural sciences as well as philosophy.  She graduated from the pedagogical school in Budapest in 1892, and obtained her doctorate in 1922 in Germany.  Her travels included extended stays in England, France and Norway. Her travels from Oslo through Bergen to Finnmark resulted in Pisma iz Norveške / Letters from Norway meditative travelogue in 1914. Her collection of short stories, Saputnici, are unusually detailed and penetrating accomplishment in self-analysis and a brave stylistic experiment. She also spoke several classical as well as nine modern languages.

Sekulić's lyrical, meditative, introspective and analytical writings come at the dawn of Serbian prose writing.  Sekulić is concerned with the human condition of man in his new, thoroughly modern sensibility.  In her main novel, The Chronicle of a Small Town Cemetery (Кроника паланачког гробља), she writes in opposition to the usual chronological development of events.  Instead, each part of the book begins in the cemetery, eventually returning to the time of bustling life, with all its joys and tragedies.  Characters such as Gospa Nola, are the first strong female characters in Serbian literature, painted in detail in all their courage, pride and determination.

Isidora Sekulić also wrote critical writings in the areas of music, theatre, art, architecture and literature and philosophy.  She wrote major studies of Yugoslav, Russian, English, German, French, Italian, Norwegian and other literatures.

Selected works
 Saputnici (1913)
 Pisma iz Norveške (1914) 
 Iz prošlosti (1919)
 Đakon Bogorodičine crkve (1919) 
 Kronika palanačkog groblja (1940) 
 Zapisi (1941)
 Analitički trenuci i teme, 1-3 (1941) 
 Zapisi o mome narodu (1948)
 Njegošu knjiga duboke odanosti (1951)
 Govor i jezik, kulturna smotra naroda (1956).

On her work

 Vladislava Ribnikar, Književni pogledi Isidore Sekulić (The Literary Views of Isidora Sekulić) Belgrade, Prosveta, 1986.
Magdalena Koch, Fellow Travellers Of A Serbian Woman, Wrocław 1998.
Sonja Veselinović, Notes on Translation in the Work of Isidora Sekulić, Srbistika danas, University of Banja Luka 2017.

Isidora Sekulić Award
Since 1968, the municipality of Savski venac endows the literary prize Isidora Sekulić Award annually, honoring contemporary authors for significant achievement in the field of literature, and encouraging their literary creativity in the sense of the work of Isidora Sekulić, who spent the last years of her life in a small house with garden on Topčider Hill.

See also
 Jelena Dimitrijević
 Mir-Jam

References

Bibliography
 Jugoslovenski Književni Leksikon (Encyclopedia of Yugoslav Literature), Matica Srpska, Novi Sad, 1984.
 Jovan Skerlić, Istorija Nove Srpske Književnosti (Belgrade, 1921) page 476.
 

1877 births
1958 deaths
People from Titel
Serbian writers
20th-century Serbian women writers
Women travel writers
Serbian non-fiction writers
Serbian travel writers
Austro-Hungarian writers
Yugoslav writers